Crystal Mass is the fourth album by The Tear Garden, released four years after To Be an Angel Blind, the Crippled Soul Divide. It has the same line-up as the previous release.

This was their last album released on Nettwerk.

Track listing
All tracks by The Tear Garden

 "Lament" – 6:28
 "The Double Spades Effect" – 5:13
 "Desert Island Disc" – 5:23
 "Hopeful" – 3:28
 "Her Majesty's Trusted Food Taster" – 6:54
 "Castaway" – 5:17
 "Feathered Friends" – 4:56
 "To Mourn the Death of Colour" – 12:39
 "Six of One" – 7:26

Personnel 
Martijn de Kleer – acoustic guitar, violin, electric guitar
Rachel K. – artwork
Edward Ka-Spel – keyboards, vocals, producer, electronics
cEvin Key – acoustic guitar, percussion, drums, keyboards, producer, electronics, tapes
Remco Polman – image manipulation
Niels Van Hoorn – flute
Bill Van Rooy – hand percussion
Frankie Verschuuren – producer, engineer

Crystal Mass has a tracking error: tracks 4 and 5 ("Hopeful" and "Her Majesty's Trusted Food Taster") are indexed as a single 10:23 track. In addition, the track listing on the album mistakenly titles track 6 as "Her Majesty's Trusted Food Taster" when in fact it is "Castaway".

"To Mourn the Death of Colour" is used as a lyric in The Legendary Pink Dots song "Cheraderama".

References

2000 albums
The Tear Garden albums
Nettwerk Records albums